Carlos Morais may refer to:

 Carlos Morais (basketball) (born 1985), Angolan basketball player
 Carlos Pedro Silva Morais, Cape Verdean association football (soccer) player